Bonnyrigg is one of the six wards used to elect members of Midlothian Council. It elects three Councillors.

Councillors

Election results

2017 election
2017 Midlothian Council election

2012 election
2012 Midlothian Council election

2007 election
2007 Midlothian Council election

References

Wards of Midlothian
Bonnyrigg and Lasswade